Federico Ruiz Hurtado (born February 8, 1948) is a Venezuelan composer, arranger, and arts administrator. He has composed in diverse genres including symphonic, chamber, and electroacoustic music.

Ruiz was born in Caracas, Venezuela. Ruiz graduated in 1974.

In 1976, Ruiz founded the Quinteto Cantaclaro, which consisted of members Carola Marcano, Inés Feo La Cruz, Efraín Arteaga, Gonzalo Peña, and Felipe Izcaray. His music for film has earned wide popularity in Venezuela and many of his works are part of the repertoire of ensembles in El Sistema.

Pianist Clara Rodríguez has championed and recorded Ruiz's music.

References

External links
Federico Ruiz's blog

Venezuelan composers
20th-century composers
21st-century composers
Living people
1948 births
Musicians from Caracas
People from Caracas